Pietro Cossali (1748, Verona — 1815, Padua) was an Italian mathematician, physicist and astronomer.

From 1787 to 1805, he taught physics at the University of Parma. In 1805, Napoleon named Cossali a professor of higher calculus at the University of Padua.

From 1797 to 1799, he wrote Origin, Transmission to Italy, and Early Progress of Algebra There, in which he describes mathematical achievements from the emergence of algebra due to Fibonacci to the new research on casus irreducibilis in the 18th century. This work can be considered the first professional text on the history of Italian mathematics. In this work, Cossali corrects some factual mistakes made earlier by Jean Paul de Gua de Malves, John Wallis and Jean-Étienne Montucla, although he makes another important error in attributing everything after Fibonacci and before Luca Pacioli to the latter.

Besides his works on mathematics and its history, Cossali also wrote on astronomy. His articles were published in Ephémérides astronomiques.

References 

Italian mathematicians
1748 births
1815 deaths